Ourossogui  is an arrondissement of the Matam Department in the Matam Region of Senegal.

Subdivisions
The arrondissement is divided administratively into rural communities and in turn into villages.

Arrondissements of Senegal
Matam Region